Lepidoptera of New Zealand consist of both the butterflies and moths recorded from the islands of New Zealand. According to a recent estimate, there are a total of approximately 1,800 Lepidoptera species present in New Zealand. Of these, about 1,600 are endemic. Lepidoptera is the third largest insect order in New Zealand.

This page provides a link to either individual species or genera. The latter is used when all species of the genus are endemic to New Zealand, the individual species can be found on the genus page.

Butterflies

Lycaenidae 
Lampides boeticus (Linnaeus, 1767)
Lycaena boldenarum White, 1862
Lycaena boldenarum boldenarum White, 1862
Lycaena boldenarum caerulaea (Salmon, 1946)
Lycaena boldenarum ianthina (Salmon, 1946)
Lycaena feredayi (Bates, 1867)
Lycaena rauparaha (Fereday, 1877)
Lycaena salustius (Fabricius, 1793)
Zizina otis labradus (Godart, 1824)
Zizina oxleyi (C. & R. Felder, 1865)

Nymphalidae 
Argyrophenga antipodum Doubleday, 1845
Argyrophenga harrisi Craw, 1978
Argyrophenga janitae Craw, 1978
Danaus petilia (Stoll, 1790) [Not established in N.Z.; vagrant only (non-breeding immigrant)]
Danaus plexippus (Linnaeus, 1758)
Dodonidia helmsii Butler, 1884
Erebiola butleri Fereday, 1879
Hypolimnas bolina nerina (Fabricius, 1775) [Not established in N.Z.; vagrant only (non-breeding immigrant)]
Junonia villida calybe Godart, 1819 [Not established in N.Z.; vagrant only (non-breeding immigrant)]
Melanitis leda bankia (Fabricius, 1775) [Not established in N.Z.; vagrant only (non-breeding immigrant)]
Percnodaimon merula (Hewitson, 1875)
Tirumala hamata hamata (MacLeay, 1826) [Not established in N.Z.; vagrant only (non-breeding immigrant)]
Vanessa gonerilla (Fabricius, 1775)
Vanessa gonerilla gonerilla (Fabricius, 1775)
Vanessa gonerilla ida (Alfken, 1899)
Vanessa itea (Fabricius, 1775)
Vanessa kershawi (McCoy, 1868) [Not resident in N.Z.; breeding migrant]

Pieridae 
Catopsilia pomona (Fabricius, 1775) [Not established in N.Z.]
Pieris rapae (Linnaeus, 1758)

Moths

Arctiidae 
Metacrias erichrysa Meyrick, 1886
Metacrias huttoni (Butler, 1879)
Metacrias strategica (Hudson, 1889)
Nyctemera amicus (senecio moth; magpie moth) (White, 1841)
Nyctemera annulata (magpie moth) (Boisduval, 1832)
Tyria jacobaeae (cinnabar moth) (Linnaeus, 1758)
Utetheisa lotrix lotrix (crotalaria moth) (Cramer, 1777)
Utetheisa pulchelloides vaga Jordan, 1939

Autostichidae 
Oegoconia caradjai Popescu-Gorj & Capuse, 1965

Batrachedridae 
Batrachedra agaura Meyrick, 1901
Batrachedra arenosella (coconut moth) (Walker, 1864)
Batrachedra astricta Philpott, 1930
Batrachedra eucola Meyrick, 1889
Batrachedra filicicola Meyrick, 1917
Batrachedra litterata Philpott, 1928
Batrachedra psithyra Meyrick, 1889
Batrachedra tristicta Meyrick, 1901
Houdinia flexilissima Hoare, Dugdale & Watts, 2006

Blastobasidae 
Blastobasis marmorosella (Wollaston, 1858)

Bombycidae 
Bombyx mori (domesticated silkmoth) (Linnaeus, 1758)

Carposinidae 
Campbellana attenuata Salmon & Bradley, 1956
Coscinoptycha improbana (Australian guava moth) Meyrick, 1881
Ctenarchis cramboides Dugdale, 1995
Glaphyrarcha euthrepta Meyrick, 1938
Heterocrossa adreptella (Walker, 1864)
Heterocrossa canescens (Philpott, 1930)
Heterocrossa contactella (Walker, 1866)
Heterocrossa cryodana Meyrick, 1885
Heterocrossa epomiana Meyrick, 1885
Heterocrossa eriphylla Meyrick, 1888
Heterocrossa exochana Meyrick, 1888
Heterocrossa gonosemana Meyrick, 1882
Heterocrossa ignobilis (Philpott, 1930) 
Heterocrossa iophaea Meyrick, 1907 
Heterocrossa literata (Philpott, 1930) 
Heterocrossa maculosa (Philpott, 1927)
Heterocrossa morbida (Meyrick, 1912)
Heterocrossa philpotti Dugdale, 1971
Heterocrossa rubophaga (New Zealand raspberry budmoth) Dugdale, 1988
Heterocrossa sanctimonea (Clarke, 1926)
Heterocrossa sarcanthes (Meyrick, 1918)
Paramorpha marginata (Philpott, 1931)

Cecidosidae 
Xanadoses nielseni Hoare & Dugdale, 2003

Choreutidae 
Asterivora albifasciata (Philpott, 1924)
Asterivora analoga (Meyrick, 1912)
Asterivora antigrapha (Meyrick, 1911)
Asterivora barbigera (Meyrick, 1915)
Asterivora chatuidea (Clarke, 1926)
Asterivora colpota (Meyrick, 1911)
Asterivora combinatana (Walker, 1863)
Asterivora exocha (Meyrick, 1907)
Asterivora fasciata (Philpott, 1930)
Asterivora inspoliata (Philpott, 1930)
Asterivora iochondra (Meyrick, 1911)
Asterivora marmarea (Meyrick, 1888)
Asterivora microlitha (Meyrick, 1888)
Asterivora ministra (Meyrick, 1912)
Asterivora nivescens (Philpott, 1926)
Asterivora oleariae Dugdale, 1979
Asterivora symbolaea (Meyrick, 1888)
Asterivora tillyardi (Philpott, 1924)
Asterivora tristis (Philpott, 1930)
Asterivora urbana (Clarke, 1926)
Tebenna micalis (small thistle moth) (Mann, 1857)

Coleophoridae 
Coleophora alcyonipennella (clover case-bearer; small clover case-bearer) (Kollar, 1832)
Coleophora deauratella Lienig & Zeller, 1846
Coleophora mayrella (metallic coleophora moth) (Huebner, [1813])
Coleophora striatipennella Nylander, 1848
Coleophora versurella Zeller, 1849

Copromorphidae 
Isonomeutis amauropa Meyrick, 1888
Isonomeutis restincta Meyrick, 1923
Phycomorpha metachrysa Meyrick, 1914

Cosmopterigidae 

Circoxena ditrocha Meyrick, 1916
Cosmopterix attenuatella (Walker, 1864)
Labdia anarithma (Meyrick, 1889)
Limnaecia phragmitella (shy cosmet moth) Stainton, 1851
Microcolona characta Meyrick, 1897
Microcolona limodes Meyrick, 1897
Pyroderces aellotricha (Meyrick, 1889)
Pyroderces apparitella (Walker, 1864)
Pyroderces deamatella (Walker, 1864)
Thectophila acmotypa Meyrick, 1927

Cossidae 
Endoxyla cinereus (Tepper, 1890)

Crambidae 
Achyra affinitalis (cotton web spinner) (Lederer, 1863)
Angustalius malacelloides (Bleszynski, 1955)
Antiscopa acompa (Meyrick, 1884)
Antiscopa elaphra (Meyrick, 1884)
Antiscopa epicomia (Meyrick, 1884)
Clepsicosma iridia Meyrick, 1888
Culladia cuneiferellus(Walker, 1863)
Culladia strophaea (Meyrick, 1905)
Culladia cuneiferellus(Walker, 1863)
Deana hybreasalis (Walker, 1859)
Eudonia alopecias (Meyrick, 1901)
Eudonia asaleuta (Meyrick, 1907) 
Eudonia aspidota (Meyrick, 1884)
Eudonia asterisca (Meyrick, 1884)
Eudonia atmogramma (Meyrick, 1915)
Eudonia axena (Meyrick, 1884)
Eudonia bisinualis (Hudson, 1928)
Eudonia cataxesta (Meyrick, 1884)
Eudonia chalara (Meyrick, 1901)
Eudonia characta (Meyrick, 1884)
Eudonia chlamydota (Meyrick, 1884)
Eudonia choristis (Meyrick, 1907)
Eudonia colpota (Meyrick, 1888)
Eudonia critica (Meyrick, 1884)
Eudonia crypsinoa (Meyrick, 1884)
Eudonia cymatias (Meyrick, 1884)
Eudonia cyptastis (Meyrick, 1909)
Eudonia deltophora (Meyrick, 1884)
Eudonia dinodes (Meyrick, 1884)
Eudonia dochmia (Meyrick, 1905)
Eudonia epicremna (Meyrick, 1884)
Eudonia feredayi (Knaggs, 1867)
Eudonia gressitti (Munroe, 1964)
Eudonia gyrotoma (Meyrick, 1909)
Eudonia hemicycla (Meyrick, 1884)
Eudonia hemiplaca (Meyrick, 1889)
Eudonia legnota (Meyrick, 1884)
Eudonia leptalea (Meyrick, 1884)
Eudonia leucogramma (Meyrick, 1884)
Eudonia linealis (Walker, 1866)
Eudonia locularis (Meyrick, 1912)
Eudonia luminatrix (Meyrick, 1909)
Eudonia manganeutis (Meyrick, 1884)
Eudonia melanaegis (Meyrick, 1884)
Eudonia meliturga (Meyrick, 1905)
Eudonia microphthalma (Meyrick, 1884)
Eudonia minualis (Walker, 1866)
Eudonia octophora (Meyrick, 1884)
Eudonia oculata (Philpott, 1927)
Eudonia oreas (Meyrick, 1884)
Eudonia organaea (Meyrick, 1901)
Eudonia pachyerga (Meyrick, 1927)
Eudonia paltomacha (Meyrick, 1884)
Eudonia periphanes (Meyrick, 1885)
Eudonia philerga (Meyrick, 1884)
Eudonia philetaera (Meyrick, 1884)
Eudonia pongalis (C. Felder, R. Felder & Rogenhofer, 1875)
Eudonia psammitis campbellensis (Munroe, 1964)
Eudonia psammitis psammitis (Meyrick, 1884)
Eudonia quaestoria (Meyrick, 1929)
Eudonia rakaiaensis (Knaggs, 1867)
Eudonia sabulosella (Walker, 1863)
Eudonia steropaea (Meyrick, 1884)
Eudonia subditella (Walker, 1866)
Eudonia submarginalis (Walker, 1863)
Eudonia thyridias (Meyrick, 1905)
Eudonia torodes (Meyrick, 1901)
Eudonia triclera (Meyrick, 1905)
Eudonia trivirgata (C. Felder, R. Felder & Rogenhofer, 1875)
Eudonia ustiramis (Meyrick, 1931)
Eudonia xysmatias (Meyrick, 1907)
Eudonia zophochlaena (Meyrick, 1923)
Exsilirarcha graminea Salmon & Bradley, 1956
Gadira acerella Walker, 1866
Gadira leucophthalma (Meyrick, 1882)
Gadira petraula (Meyrick, 1882)
Glaucocharis auriscriptella (Walker, 1864)
Glaucocharis bipunctella (Walker, 1866)
Glaucocharis chrysochyta (Meyrick, 1882)
Glaucocharis elaina (Meyrick, 1882)
Glaucocharis epiphaea (Meyrick, 1885)
Glaucocharis harmonica (Meyrick, 1888)
Glaucocharis helioctypa (Meyrick, 1882)
Glaucocharis holanthes (Meyrick, 1885)
Glaucocharis interrupta (C. Felder, R. Felder & Rogenhofer, 1875)
Glaucocharis lepidella (Walker, 1866)
Glaucocharis leucoxantha (Meyrick, 1882)
Glaucocharis metallifera (Butler, 1877)
Glaucocharis microdora (Meyrick, 1905)
Glaucocharis parorma (Meyrick, 1924)
Glaucocharis planetopa (Meyrick, 1923)
Glaucocharis pyrsophanes (Meyrick, 1882)
Glaucocharis selenaea (Meyrick, 1885)
Glaucocharis stella Meyrick, 1938
Glyphodes onychinalis(Guenée, 1854)
Heliothela atra (Butler, 1877)
Hellula hydralis (cabbage centre grub) Guenee, 1854
Hellula undalis (cabbage webworm; Old World webworm) Fabricius, 1781
Hygraula nitens (pond moth; Australian water moth) (Butler, 1880)
Kupea electilis Philpott, 1930
Maoricrambus oncobolus (Meyrick, 1885)
Musotima aduncalis (C. Felder, R. Felder & Rogenhofer, 1875)
Musotima nitidalis (Walker, 1866)
Musotima ochropteralis (Guenée, 1854)
Orocrambus abditus (Philpott, 1924)
Orocrambus aethonellus (Meyrick, 1882)
Orocrambus angustipennis (Zeller, 1877)
Orocrambus apicellus (Zeller, 1863)
Orocrambus callirrhous (Meyrick, 1882)
Orocrambus catacaustus (Meyrick, 1885)
Orocrambus clarkei clarkei Philpott, 1930
Orocrambus clarkei eximia Salmon, 1946
Orocrambus corruptus (Butler, 1877)
Orocrambus crenaeus (Meyrick, 1885)
Orocrambus cultus Philpott, 1917
Orocrambus cyclopicus (Meyrick, 1882)
Orocrambus dicrenellus (Meyrick, 1883)
Orocrambus enchophorus (Meyrick, 1885)
Orocrambus ephorus (Meyrick, 1885)
Orocrambus flexuosellus (Doubleday in White & Doubleday, 1843)
Orocrambus fugitivellus (Hudson, 1950)
Orocrambus geminus Patrick, 1991
Orocrambus haplotomus (Meyrick, 1882)
Orocrambus harpophorus (Meyrick, 1882)
Orocrambus heliotes (Meyrick, 1888)
Orocrambus heteraulus (Meyrick, 1905)
Orocrambus horistes (Meyrick, 1902)
Orocrambus isochytus (Meyrick, 1888)
Orocrambus jansoni Gaskin, 1975
Orocrambus lectus (Philpott, 1929)
Orocrambus lewisi Gaskin, 1975
Orocrambus lindsayi Gaskin, 1975
Orocrambus machaeristes Meyrick, 1905
Orocrambus melampetrus Purdie, 1884
Orocrambus melitastes (Meyrick, 1909)
Orocrambus mylites Meyrick, 1888
Orocrambus oppositus (Philpott, 1915)
Orocrambus ordishi Gaskin, 1975
Orocrambus ornatus (Philpott, 1927)
Orocrambus paraxenus (Meyrick, 1885)
Orocrambus philpotti Gaskin, 1975
Orocrambus punctellus (Hudson, 1950)
Orocrambus ramosellus (Doubleday in White & Doubleday, 1843)
Orocrambus scoparioides Philpott, 1914
Orocrambus scutatus (Philpott, 1917)
Orocrambus simplex (Butler, 1877)
Orocrambus siriellus (Meyrick, 1882)
Orocrambus sophistes (Meyrick, 1905)
Orocrambus sophronellus (Meyrick, 1885)
Orocrambus thymiastes Meyrick, 1901
Orocrambus tritonellus (Meyrick, 1885)
Orocrambus tuhualis (C. Felder, R. Felder & Rogenhofer, 1875)
Orocrambus ventosus Meyrick, 1920
Orocrambus vittellus (Doubleday in White & Doubleday, 1843)
Orocrambus vulgaris (Butler, 1877)
Orocrambus xanthogrammus (Meyrick, 1882)
Proternia philocapna Meyrick, 1884
Protyparcha scaphodes Meyrick, 1909
Pyrausta comastis (Meyrick, 1884)
Sceliodes cordalis (eggfruit caterpillar) (Doubleday in White & Doubleday, 1843)
Spoladea recurvalis (Fabricius, 1775)
Tauroscopa gorgopis Meyrick, 1888
Tauroscopa notabilis Philpott, 1923
Tauroscopa trapezitis Meyrick, 1905
Tawhitia glaucophanes (Meyrick, 1907)
Tawhitia pentadactyla (Zeller, 1863)
Udea adversa (Philpott, 1917)
Udea antipodea (Salmon in Salmon & Bradley, 1956)
Udea daiclesalis (Walker, 1859)
Udea flavidalis (Doubleday in White & Doubleday, 1843)
Udea marmarina Meyrick, 1884
Udea notata (Butler, 1879)
Udea pantheropa (Meyrick, 1902)
Uresiphita maorialis (C. Felder, R. Felder & Rogenhofer, 1875)
Uresiphita ornithopteralis (Guenée, 1854)

Ctenuchidae 
Antichloris viridis (satin stowaway; banana moth) Druce, 1884

Depressariidae 
Agonopterix alstroemeriana (Clerck, 1759)
Agonopterix assimilella (Treitschke, 1832)
Agonopterix umbellana (Fabricius, 1794)
Agriophara colligatella (Walker, 1864)
Cryptolechia rhodobapta Meyrick, 1923
Cryptolechia semnodes Meyrick, 1911
Depressaria radiella (Goeze, 1783)
Donacostola notabilis (Philpott, 1928)
Eutorna caryochroa Meyrick, 1889
Eutorna inornata Philpott, 1927
Eutorna phaulocosma Meyrick, 1906
Eutorna symmorpha Meyrick, 1889
Heliostibes vibratrix Meyrick, 1927
Nymphostola galactina (C. Felder, R. Felder & Rogenhofer, 1875)
Proteodes carnifex (Butler, 1877)
Proteodes clarkei Philpott, 1926
Proteodes melographa Meyrick, 1927
Proteodes profunda Meyrick, 1905
Proteodes smithi Howes, 1946

Elachistidae 
Elachista antipodensis (Dugdale, 1971)Elachista archaeonoma Meyrick, 1889Elachista eurychora (Meyrick, 1919)Elachista exaula Meyrick, 1889Elachista galatheae (Viette, 1954)
Elachista gerasmia Meyrick, 1889
Elachista helonoma Meyrick, 1889
Elachista hookeri (Dugdale, 1971)
Elachista laquaeorum (Dugdale, 1971)
Elachista melanura Meyrick, 1889
Elachista napaea Philpott, 1930
Elachista ochroleuca Meyrick, 1923
Elachista ombrodoca Meyrick, 1889
Elachista plagiaula (Meyrick, 1938)
Elachista pumila (Dugdale, 1971)
Elachista sagittifera Philpott, 1927
Elachista thallophora Meyrick, 1889
Elachista watti Philpott, 1924

Epermeniidae 
Thambotricha vates Meyrick, 1922

Erebidae 
Pantydia sparsa Guenée, 1852

Galacticidae 
Tanaoctena dubia Philpott, 1931

Gelechiidae 
Anarsia dryinopa Lower, 1897
Anisoplaca achyrota (Meyrick, 1885)
Anisoplaca acrodactyla (Meyrick, 1907)
Anisoplaca cosmia Bradley, 1956
Anisoplaca fraxinea Philpott, 1928
Anisoplaca ptyoptera Meyrick, 1885
Aristotelia paradesma (Meyrick, 1885)
Athrips zophochalca (Meyrick, 1918)
Bilobata subsecivella (Zeller, 1852)
Chrysoesthia drurella (Fabricius, 1775)
Epiphthora melanombra Meyrick, 1888
Epiphthora nivea (Philpott, 1930)
Kiwaia aerobatis (Meyrick, 1924)
Kiwaia brontophora (Meyrick, 1885)
Kiwaia caerulaea (Hudson, 1925)
Kiwaia calaspidea (Clarke, 1934)
Kiwaia cheradias (Meyrick, 1909)
Kiwaia contraria (Philpott, 1930)
Kiwaia dividua (Philpott, 1921)
Kiwaia eurybathra (Meyrick, 1931)
Kiwaia glaucoterma (Meyrick, 1911)
Kiwaia heterospora (Meyrick, 1924)
Kiwaia hippeis (Meyrick, 1901)
Kiwaia jeanae Philpott, 1930
Kiwaia lapillosa (Meyrick, 1924)
Kiwaia lenis (Philpott, 1929)
Kiwaia lithodes (Meyrick, 1885)
Kiwaia matermea (Povolny, 1974)
Kiwaia monophragma (Meyrick, 1885)
Kiwaia neglecta (Philpott, 1924)
Kiwaia parapleura (Meyrick, 1886
Kiwaia parvula Philpott, 1930
Kiwaia pharetria Meyrick, 1885)
Kiwaia plemochoa (Meyrick, 1916)
Kiwaia pumila (Philpott, 1928)
Kiwaia schematica (Meyrick, 1885)
Kiwaia thyraula (Meyrick, 1885)
Megacraspedus calamogonus Meyrick, 1885
Monochroa leptocrossa (Meyrick, 1926)
Phthorimaea operculella (potato tuber moth; tobacco splitworm) (Zeller, 1873)
Platyedra subcinerea (Haworth, 1828)
Scrobipalpa obsoletella ((Fischer von Röslerstamm, 1841)
Sitotroga cerealella (Angoumois grain moth) (Olivier, 1789)
Symmetrischema striatella (Murtfeldt, 1900)
Symmetrischema tangolias (South American potato tuber moth; Andean potato tuber moth; tomato stemborer) (Gyen, 1913)
Thiotricha lindsayi Philpott, 1927
Thiotricha oleariae Hudson, 1928
Thiotricha tetraphala (Meyrick, 1885)
Thiotricha thorybodes (Meyrick, 1885)

Geometridae 
Adeixis griseata (Hudson, 1903)
Anachloris subochraria (Doubleday, 1843)
Aponotoreas anthracias (Meyrick, 1883)
Aponotoreas dissimilis (Philpott, 1914)
Aponotoreas incompta (Philpott, 1918)
Aponotoreas insignis (Butler, 1877)
Aponotoreas orphnaea (Meyrick, 1884)
Aponotoreas synclinalis (Hudson, 1903)
Aponotoreas villosa (Philpott, 1917)
Arctesthes catapyrrha (Butler, 1877)
Arctesthes siris (Hudson, 1908)
Asaphodes abrogata (Walker, 1862)
Asaphodes adonis (Hudson, 1898)
Asaphodes aegrota (Butler, 1879)
Asaphodes albalineata (Philpott, 1915)
Asaphodes aphelias (Prout, 1939)
Asaphodes beata (Butler, 1877)
Asaphodes camelias (Meyrick, 1888)
Asaphodes campbellensis (Dugdale, 1964)
Asaphodes cataphracta (Meyrick, 1883)
Asaphodes chionogramma (Meyrick, 1883)
Asaphodes chlamydota (Meyrick, 1883)
Asaphodes chlorocapna (Meyrick, 1925)
Asaphodes cinnabari (Howes, 1912)
Asaphodes citroena (Clarke, 1934)
Asaphodes clarata (Walker, 1862)
Asaphodes cosmodora (Meyrick, 1888)
Asaphodes declarata (Prout, 1914)
Asaphodes dionysias (Meyrick, 1907)
Asaphodes exoriens (Prout, 1912)
Asaphodes frivola (Meyrick, 1913)
Asaphodes glaciata (Hudson, 1925)
Asaphodes helias (Meyrick, 1883)
Asaphodes ida (Clarke, 1926)
Asaphodes imperfecta (Philpott, 1905)
Asaphodes limonodes (Meyrick, 1888)
Asaphodes mnesichola (Meyrick, 1888)
Asaphodes nephelias (Meyrick, 1883)
Asaphodes obarata (Felder & Rogenhofer, 1875)
Asaphodes omichlias (Meyrick, 1883)
Asaphodes oraria (Philpott, 1903)
Asaphodes oxyptera (Hudson, 1909)
Asaphodes periphaea (Meyrick, 1905)
Asaphodes philpotti (Prout, 1927)
Asaphodes prasinias (Meyrick, 1883)
Asaphodes prymnaea (Meyrick, 1911)
Asaphodes recta (Philpott, 1905)
Asaphodes sericodes (Meyrick, 1915)
Asaphodes stephanitis Meyrick, 1907
Asaphodes stinaria (Guenée, 1868)
Austrocidaria anguligera (Butler, 1879)
Austrocidaria arenosa (Howes, 1911)
Austrocidaria bipartita (Prout, 1958)
Austrocidaria callichlora (Butler, 1879)
Austrocidaria cedrinodes (Meyrick, 1911)
Austrocidaria gobiata (Felder & Rogenhofer, 1875)
Austrocidaria haemophaea (Meyrick, 1925)
Austrocidaria lithurga (Meyrick, 1911)
Austrocidaria parora (Meyrick, 1885)
Austrocidaria praerupta (Philpott, 1918)
Austrocidaria prionota (Meyrick, 1884)
Austrocidaria similata (Walker, 1862)
Austrocidaria stricta (Philpott, 1915)
Austrocidaria umbrosa (Philpott, 1917)
Austrocidaria venustatis (Salmon, 1946) 
Cephalissa siria Meyrick, 1883
Chalastra aristarcha (Meyrick, 1892)
Chalastra ochrea (Howes, 1911)
Chalastra pellurgata Walker, 1862
Chloroclystis filata (filata moth) (Guenee, 1857)
Chloroclystis impudicis Dugdale, 1964
Chloroclystis inductata (Walker, 1862)
Chloroclystis lichenodes (Purdie, 1887)
Chloroclystis nereis (Meyrick, 1888)
Chloroclystis sphragitis (Meyrick, 1888)
Chloroclystis testulata (pome looper) Guenee, 1857
Cleora scriptaria (Walker, 1860)
Chrysolarentia subrectaria (Guenee, 1858)
Dasyuris anceps (Butler, 1877)
Dasyuris austrina Philpott, 1928
Dasyuris callicrena (Meyrick, 1883)
Dasyuris catadees Prout, 1939
Dasyuris enysii (Butler, 1877)
Dasyuris fulminea Philpott, 1915
Dasyuris hectori (Butler, 1877)
Dasyuris leucobathra Meyrick, 1911
Dasyuris micropolis Meyrick, 1929
Dasyuris octans Hudson, 1923
Dasyuris partheniata Guenee, 1868
Dasyuris pluviata Hudson, 1928
Dasyuris strategica (Meyrick, 1883)
Dasyuris transaurea Howes, 1912
Declana atronivea (Walker, 1865)
Declana egregia (C. Felder, R. Felder & Rogenhofer, 1875)
Declana feredayi Butler, 1877
Declana floccosa (forest semilooper) Walker, 1858
Declana glacialis Hudson, 1903
Declana griseata Hudson, 1898
Declana hermione Hudson, 1898
Declana junctilinea (Walker, 1865)
Declana leptomera (Walker, 1858)
Declana niveata Butler, 1879
Declana toreuta Meyrick, 1929
Dichromodes cynica Meyrick, 1911
Dichromodes gypsotis Meyrick, 1888
Dichromodes ida Hudson, 1905
Dichromodes niger (Butler, 1877)
Dichromodes simulans Hudson, 1905
Dichromodes sphaeriata (C. Felder, R. Felder & Rogenhofer, 1875)
Elvia glaucata Walker, 1862
Epicyme rubropunctaria (Doubleday in White & Doubleday, 1843)
Epiphryne charidema (Meyrick, 1909)
Epiphryne undosata (C. Felder, R. Felder & Rogenhofer, 1875)
Epiphryne verriculata (cabbage tree moth) (C. Felder, R. Felder & Rogenhofer, 1875)
Epiphryne xanthaspis (Meyrick, 1883)
Epyaxa lucidata (Walker, 1862)
Epyaxa rosearia (native looper) (Doubleday in White & Doubleday, 1843)
Epyaxa venipunctata (Walker, 1863)
Gellonia dejectaria (brown evening moth) (Walker, 1860)
Gellonia pannularia (Guenee, 1868)
Gingidiobora nebulosa (Philpott, 1917)
Gingidiobora subobscurata (Walker, 1862)
Helastia alba Craw, 1987
Helastia angusta Craw, 1987
Helastia christinae Craw, 1987
Helastia cinerearia (Doubleday, 1843)
Helastia clandestina (Philpott, 1921)
Helastia corcularia  (Guenee, 1868)
Helastia cryptica Craw, 1987
Helastia cymozeucta (Meyrick, 1913)
Helastia expolita (Philpott, 1917)
Helastia farinata (Warren, 1896)
Helastia mutabilis Craw, 1987
Helastia ohauensis Craw, 1987
Helastia plumbea (Philpott, 1915)
Helastia salmoni Craw, 1987
Helastia scissa Craw, 1987
Helastia semisignata (Walker, 1862)
Helastia siris (Hawthorne, 1897)
Helastia triphragma (Meyrick, 1883)
Homodotis amblyterma (Meyrick, 1931)
Homodotis falcata (Butler, 1879)
Homodotis megaspilata (Walker, 1862)
Horisme suppressaria (Walker, 1863)
Hydriomena arida (Butler, 1879)
Hydriomena canescens Philpott, 1918
Hydriomena clarkei (Howes, 1917)
Hydriomena deltoidata (Walker, 1862)
Hydriomena hemizona Meyrick, 1897
Hydriomena iolanthe Hudson, 1939
Hydriomena purpurifera Fereday, 1884
Hydriomena rixata (C. Felder, R. Felder & Rogenhofer, 1875)
Ischalis dugdalei Weintraub & Scoble, 2004
Ischalis fortinata (Guenee, 1868)
Ischalis gallaria (Walker, 1860)
Ischalis nelsonaria (C. Felder, R. Felder & Rogenhofer, 1875)
Ischalis variabilis (Warren, 1895)
Microdes epicryptis Meyrick, 1897
Microdes quadristrigata Walker, 1862
Notoreas arcuata Philpott, 1921
Notoreas atmogramma Meyrick, 1911
Notoreas blax Prout, 1939
Notoreas casanova Patrick & Hoare, 2010
Notoreas chioneres Prout, 1939
Notoreas chrysopeda (Meyrick, 1888)
Notoreas edwardsi Patrick & Hoare, 2010
Notoreas galaxias Hudson, 1928
Notoreas hexaleuca (Meyrick, 1914)
Notoreas ischnocyma Meyrick, 1905
Notoreas isoleuca Meyrick, 1897
Notoreas isomoera Prout, 1939
Notoreas mechanitis (Meyrick, 1883)
Notoreas niphocrena (Meyrick, 1883)
Notoreas ortholeuca Hudson, 1923
Notoreas paradelpha (Meyrick, 1883)
Notoreas perornata (Walker, 1863)
Notoreas simplex Hudson, 1898
Orthoclydon chlorias (Meyrick, 1884)
Orthoclydon praefectata (Walker, 1861)
Orthoclydon pseudostinaria (Hudson, 1918)
Paradetis porphyrias (Meyrick, 1883)
Paranotoreas brephosata (Walker, 1862)
Paranotoreas ferox (Butler, 1877)
Paranotoreas fulva (Hudson, 1905)
Paranotoreas opipara Philpott, 1915
Paranotoreas zopyra (Meyrick, 1883)
Pasiphila acompsa (Prout, 1927)
Pasiphila aristias (Meyrick, 1897)
Pasiphila bilineolata (Walker, 1862)
Pasiphila charybdis (Butler, 1879)
Pasiphila cotinaea (Meyrick, 1913)
Pasiphila dryas Meyrick, 1891
Pasiphila erratica (Philpott, 1916)
Pasiphila fumipalpata (C. Felder, R. Felder & Rogenhofer, 1875)
Pasiphila furva (Philpott, 1917)
Pasiphila halianthes (Meyrick, 1907)
Pasiphila heighwayi (Philpott, 1927)
Pasiphila humilis (Philpott, 1917)
Pasiphila lunata (Philpott, 1912)
Pasiphila magnimaculata (Philpott, 1915)
Pasiphila malachita (Meyrick, 1913)
Pasiphila melochlora (Meyrick, 1911)
Pasiphila muscosata (Walker, 1862)
Pasiphila nebulosa Dugdale, 1971
Pasiphila plinthina Meyrick, 1888
Pasiphila punicea (Philpott, 1923)
Pasiphila rivalis (Philpott, 1916)
Pasiphila rubella (Philpott, 1915)
Pasiphila sandycias (Meyrick, 1905)
Pasiphila semochlora (Meyrick, 1919)
Pasiphila suffusa (Hudson, 1928)
Pasiphila urticae (Hudson, 1939)
Pasiphila vieta (Hudson, 1950)
Phrissogonus laticostatus (apple looper) (Walker, 1862)
Poecilasthena pulchraria (Doubleday in White & Doubleday, 1843)
Poecilasthena schistaria (Walker, 1861)
Poecilasthena subpurpureata (Walker, 1863)
Pseudocoremia albafasciata (Philpott, 1915)
Pseudocoremia amaculata Stephens & Gibbs, 2003
Pseudocoremia berylia (Howes, 1943)
Pseudocoremia campbelli (Philpott, 1927)
Pseudocoremia cineracia Howes, 1942
Pseudocoremia colpogramma (Meyrick, 1936)
Pseudocoremia dugdalei Stephens & Gibbs, 2003
Pseudocoremia fascialata (Philpott, 1903)
Pseudocoremia fenerata (C. Felder, R. Felder & Rogenhofer, 1875)
Pseudocoremia flava Warren, 1896
Pseudocoremia fluminea (Philpott, 1926)
Pseudocoremia foxi Stephens, Gibbs, Patrick, 2007
Pseudocoremia hollyae Stephens, Gibbs, Patrick, 2007
Pseudocoremia hudsoni Stephens, Gibbs, Patrick, 2007
Pseudocoremia indistincta Butler, 1877
Pseudocoremia insignita (Philpott, 1930)
Pseudocoremia lactiflua (Meyrick, 1912)
Pseudocoremia leucelaea (Meyrick, 1909)
Pseudocoremia lupinata (C. Felder, R. Felder & Rogenhofer, 1875)
Pseudocoremia lutea (Philpott, 1914)
Pseudocoremia melinata (C. Felder, R. Felder & Rogenhofer, 1875)
Pseudocoremia modica (Philpott, 1921)
Pseudocoremia monacha (Hudson, 1903)
Pseudocoremia ombrodes (Meyrick, 1902)
Pseudocoremia pergrata (Philpott, 1930)
Pseudocoremia productata (Walker, 1862)
Pseudocoremia rudisata (Walker, 1862)
Pseudocoremia suavis (common forest looper) Butler, 1879
Pseudocoremia terrena (Philpott, 1915)
Samana acutata Butler, 1877
Samana falcatella Walker, 1863
Sarisa muriferata (Walker, 1863)
Scopula rubraria (Doubleday in White & Doubleday, 1843)
Sestra flexata (Walker, 1862)
Sestra humeraria (Walker, 1861)
Sigillictystis insigillata (Walker, 1862)
Tatosoma agrionata (Walker, 1862)
Tatosoma alta Philpott, 1913
Tatosoma apicipallida Prout, 1914
Tatosoma fasciata Philpott, 1914
Tatosoma lestevata (Walker, 1862)
Tatosoma monoviridisata Clarke, 1920
Tatosoma tipulata (Walker, 1862)
Tatosoma topea Philpott, 1903
Tatosoma transitaria (Walker, 1862)
Theoxena scissaria (Guenee, 1868)
Xanthorhoe bulbulata (Guenee, 1868)
Xanthorhoe frigida Howes, 1946
Xanthorhoe lophogramma Meyrick, 1897
Xanthorhoe occulta Philpott, 1903
Xanthorhoe orophyla (Meyrick, 1883)
Xanthorhoe orophylloides Hudson, 1909
Xanthorhoe semifissata (Walker, 1862)
Xyridacma alectoraria (Walker, 1860)
Xyridacma ustaria (Walker, 1863)
Xyridacma veronicae Prout, 1934
Zermizinga indocilisaria Walker, 1863

Glyphipterigidae 
Glyphipterix achlyoessa (Meyrick, 1880)
Glyphipterix acronoma Meyrick, 1888
Glyphipterix acrothecta Meyrick, 1880
Glyphipterix aenea Philpott, 1917
Glyphipterix aerifera Meyrick, 1912
Glyphipterix astrapaea Meyrick, 1880
Glyphipterix ataracta (Meyrick, 1888)
Glyphipterix aulogramma Meyrick, 1907
Glyphipterix bactrias Meyrick, 1911
Glyphipterix barbata Philpott, 1918
Glyphipterix brachydelta Meyrick, 1916
Glyphipterix calliactis Meyrick, 1914
Glyphipterix cionophora (Meyrick, 1888)
Glyphipterix codonias Meyrick, 1909
Glyphipterix dichorda Meyrick, 1911
Glyphipterix erastis Meyrick, 1911
Glyphipterix euastera Meyrick, 1880
Glyphipterix iocheaera Meyrick, 1880
Glyphipterix leptosema Meyrick, 1888
Glyphipterix metasticta Meyrick, 1907
Glyphipterix morangella C. Felder, R. Felder & Rogenhofer, 1875
Glyphipterix necopina Philpott, 1927
Glyphipterix nephoptera Meyrick, 1888
Glyphipterix octonaria Philpott, 1924
Glyphipterix oxymachaera (Meyrick, 1880)
Glyphipterix rugata Meyrick, 1915
Glyphipterix scintilella Walker, 1864
Glyphipterix scintilla Clarke, 1926
Glyphipterix scolias Meyrick, 1910
Glyphipterix similis Philpott, 1928
Glyphipterix simpliciella (Stephens, 1834)
Glyphipterix triselena Meyrick, 1880
Glyphipterix tungella C. Felder, R. Felder & Rogenhofer, 1875
Glyphipterix xestobela (Meyrick, 1888)
Glyphipterix zelota Meyrick, 1888
Pantosperma holochalca Meyrick, 1888

Gracillariidae 
Acrocercops aellomacha (Meyrick, 1880)
Acrocercops aethalota (Meyrick, 1880)
Acrocercops alysidota (wattle miner) (Meyrick, 1880)
Acrocercops laciniella (Meyrick, 1880)  
Acrocercops panacicorticis (Watt, 1920)
Acrocercops panacifinens (Watt, 1920)
Acrocercops panacitorsens (Watt, 1920)
Acrocercops panacivagans (Watt, 1920)
Acrocercops panacivermiformis (Watt, 1920)
Acrocercops zorionella (Hudson, 1918)
Caloptilia azaleella (azalea leaf miner) (Brants, 1913)
Caloptilia chalcodelta (Meyrick, 1889)
Caloptilia chrysitis (Felder & Rogenhofer, 1875)
Caloptilia elaeas (Meyrick, 1911)
Caloptilia linearis (Butler, 1877)
Caloptilia octopunctata (Turner, 1894)
Caloptilia selenitis (Meyrick, 1909)
Conopomorpha cyanospila Meyrick, 1885
Dialectica scalariella (Zeller, 1850)
Macarostola ida (Meyrick, 1880)
Macarostola miniella (C. Felder, R. Felder & Rogenhofer, 1875)
Parectopa leucocyma (kauri leaf miner) (Meyrick, 1889)
Phyllonorycter messaniella (European oak leaf miner; Zeller's midget) (Zeller, 1846)
Porphyrosela hardenbergiella (Wise, 1957)
Polysoma eumetalla (Meyrick, 1880)
Sabulopteryx botanica Hoare & Patrick, 2019

Hepialidae 
Aenetus virescens (puriri moth) (Doubleday in White & Doubleday, 1843)
Aoraia aspina Dugdale, 1994
Aoraia aurimaculata (Philpott, 1914)
Aoraia dinodes (Meyrick, 1890)
Aoraia ensyii (Butler, 1877)
Aoraia flavida Dugdale, 1994
Aoraia hespera Dugdale, 1994
Aoraia insularis Dugdale, 1994
Aoraia lenis Dugdale, 1994
Aoraia macropis Dugdale, 1994
Aoraia oreobolae Dugdale, 1994
Aoraia orientalis Dugdale, 1994
Aoraia rufivena (rufous-veined aoraia) Dugdale, 1994
Aoraia senex (Hudson, 1908)
Cladoxycanus minos (Hudson, 1905)
Dioxycanus fuscus (Philpott, 1914)
Dioxycanus oreas (Hudson, 1920)
Dumbletonius characterifer (Walker, 1865)
Dumbletonius unimaculatus (Salmon, 1948)
Heloxycanus patricki (ghost moth; sphagnum porina moth) Dugdale, 1994
Wiseana cervinata (porina moth) (Walker, 1865)
Wiseana copularis (Meyrick, 1912)
Wiseana fuliginea (Butler, 1879)
Wiseana jocosa (Meyrick, 1912)
Wiseana mimica (Philpott, 1923)
Wiseana signata (Walker, 1856)
Wiseana umbraculata (Guenee, 1868)

Incurvariidae 
Rhathamictis perspersa Meyrick, 1924

Lecithoceridae 
Compsistis bifaciella (Walker, 1864)
Lecithocera micromela (Lower, 1897)
Sarisophora leucoscia Turner, 1919

Lymantriidae 
Orgyia thyellina (white-spotted tussock moth) Butler, 1881
Teia anartoides (painted apple moth) Walker, 1855

Lyonetidae 
Bedellia psamminella Meyrick, 1889
Bedellia somnulentella (sweet potato leaf miner) (Zeller, 1847)
Cateristis eustyla Meyrick, 1889
Leucoptera spartifoliella (Scotch broom twig miner) (Hübner, [1810-1813])
Stegommata leptomitella Meyrick, 1880
Stegommata sulfuratella Meyrick, 1880

Micropterigidae 
Sabatinca aemula Philpott, 1924
Sabatinca aenea Hudson, 1923
Sabatinca aurantissima Gibbs, 2014
Sabatinca aurella Hudson, 1918
Sabatinca bimacula Gibbs, 2014
Sabatinca calliarcha Meyrick, 1912
Sabatinca caustica Meyrick, 1912
Sabatinca chalcophanes (Meyrick, 1885)
Sabatinca chrysargyra (Meyrick, 1885)
Sabatinca demissa Philpott, 1923
Sabatinca doroxena (Meyrick, 1888)
Sabatinca heighwayi Philpott, 1927
Sabatinca ianthina Philpott, 1921
Sabatinca incongruella Walker, 1863
Sabatinca lucilia Clarke, 1920
Sabatinca pluvialis Gibbs, 2014
Sabatinca quadrijuga Meyrick, 1912
Sabatinca weheka Gibbs, 2014
Zealandopterix zonodoxa (Meyrick, 1888)

Mnesarchaeidae 
Mnesarchella acuta (Philpott, 1919)
Mnesarchella dugdalei Gibbs, 2019
Mnesarchella falcata Gibbs, 2019
Mnesarchaea fallax Philpott, 1927
Mnesarchaea fusca Philpott, 1922
Mnesarchella fusilella (Walker, 1864)
Mnesarchella hamadelpha (Meyrick, 1888)
Mnesarchaea hudsoni Gibbs, 2019
Mnesarchella loxoscia (Meyrick, 1888)
Mnesarchella ngahuru Gibbs, 2019
Mnesarchaea paracosma Meyrick, 1885
Mnesarchella philpotti Gibbs, 2019
Mnesarchella stellae Gibbs, 2019
Mnesarchella vulcanica Gibbs, 2019

Momphidae 
Zapyrastra calliphana Meyrick, 1889
Zapyrastra stellata (Philpott, 1931)

Nepticulidae 
Stigmella aigialeia Donner & Wilkinson, 1989
Stigmella aliena Donner & Wilkinson, 1989
Stigmella atrata Donner & Wilkinson, 1989
Stigmella cassiniae Donner & Wilkinson, 1989
Stigmella childi Donner & Wilkinson, 1989
Stigmella cypracma (Meyrick, 1916)
Stigmella erysibodea Donner & Wilkinson, 1989
Stigmella fulva (Watt, 1921)
Stigmella hakekeae Donner & Wilkinson, 1989
Stigmella hamishella Donner & Wilkinson, 1989
Stigmella hoheriae Donner & Wilkinson, 1989
Stigmella ilsea Donner & Wilkinson, 1989
Stigmella insignis (Philpott, 1927)
Stigmella kaimanua Donner & Wilkinson, 1989
Stigmella laqueorum (Dugdale, 1971)
Stigmella lucida (Philpott, 1919)
Stigmella maoriella (Walker, 1864)
Stigmella microtheriella (Stainton, 1854)
Stigmella ogygia (Meyrick, 1889)
Stigmella oriastra (Meyrick, 1917)
Stigmella palaga Donner & Wilkinson, 1989
Stigmella platina Donner & Wilkinson, 1989
Stigmella progama (Meyrick, 1924)
Stigmella progonopis (Meyrick, 1921)
Stigmella propalaea (Meyrick, 1889)
Stigmella sophorae (Hudson, 1939)
Stigmella tricentra (Meyrick, 1889)
Stigmella watti Donner & Wilkinson, 1989

Noctuidae 
Achaea janata (castor semi-looper) (Linnaeus, 1758)
Agrotis admirationis Guenée, 1868
Agrotis infusa (bogong moth) Boisduval, 1838
Agrotis innominata Hudson, 1898
Agrotis ipsilon (dark sword-grass; black cutworm) (Hufnagel, 1766)
Agrotis munda (brown cutworm; pink cutworm) (Walker, 1857)
Anomis flava (cotton looper; tropical anomis; white-pupilled scallop moth) Fabricius, 1775
Anomis involuta (jute looper; hibiscus cutworm) (Walker, 1858)
Anticarsia irrorata (irrorated tabby) (Fabricius, 1781)
Arcte coerula (ramie moth) (Guenee, 1852)
Artigisa melanephele Hampson, 1914
Athetis tenuis (Butler, 1886)
Athetis thoracica (Moore, 1884) (recorded as Athetis nonagrica)
Australothis volatilis Matthews & Patrick, 1998
Austramathes fortis (Butler, 1880)
Austramathes coelacantha Hoare, 2017
Austramathes purpurea (Butler, 1879)
Austramathes pessota (Meyrick, 1887)
Austramathes squaliolus Hoare, 2017
Bityla defigurata (Walker, 1865)
Bityla sericea Butler, 1877
Callopistria maillardi (Guénée, 1862)
Chrysodeixis argentifera (tobacco looper) (Guenee, 1852)
Chrysodeixis eriosoma (green garden looper) (Doubleday in White & Doubleday, 1843)
Condica illecta (Walker, 1865)
Cosmodes elegans (green blotched moth) (Donovan, 1805)
Ctenoplusia albostriata (Bremer & Grey, 1853)
Ctenoplusia limbirena (Guenée, 1852)
Dasypodia cymatodes (northern old lady) Guenee, 1852
Dasypodia selenophora (southern old lady) Guenee, 1852
Diarsia intermixta (Guenee, 1852)
Ectopatria aspera (Walker, 1857)
Eudocima phalonia (fruit-piercing moth) (Clerck, 1764)
Eudocima materna (Linnaeus, 1767)
Euxoa ceropachoides (Guenée, 1868)
Feredayia graminosa (mahoe stripper; green mahoe moth) (Walker, 1857)
Grammodes pulcherrima T.P. Lucas, 1892
Helicoverpa armigera conferta (cotton bollworm; corn earworm; Old World (African) bollworm) (Walker, 1857)
Helicoverpa punctigera (native budworm; Australian bollworm) (Wallengren, 1860)
Hydrillodes surata Meyrick, 1910
Hypena gonospilalis (Walker, 1866)
Hypocala deflorata australiae Butler, 1892
Ichneutica acontistis (Meyrick, 1887)
Ichneutica agorastis (Meyrick, 1887)
Ichneutica alopa (Meyrick, 1887)
Ichneutica arotis (Meyrick, 1887)
Ichneutica atristriga (Walker, 1865)
Ichneutica averilla (Hudson, 1921)
Ichneutica barbara Hoare, 2019
Ichneutica blenheimensis (Fereday, 1883)
Ichneutica bromias (Meyrick, 1902)
Ichneutica brunneosa (Fox, 1970)
Ichneutica cana Howes, 1914
Ichneutica ceraunias Meyrick, 1887
Ichneutica chlorodonta (Hampson, 1911)
Ichneutica chryserythra (Hampson, 1905)
Ichneutica cornuta Hoare, 2019
Ichneutica cuneata (Philpott, 1916)
Ichneutica dione Hudson, 1898
Ichneutica disjungens (Walker, 1858)
Ichneutica dundastica Hoare, 2019
Ichneutica emmersonorum Hoare, 2019
Ichneutica epiastra (Meyrick, 1911)
Ichneutica erebia (Hudson, 1909)
Ichneutica falsidica (Meyrick, 1911)
Ichneutica fenwicki (Philpott, 1921)
Ichneutica fibriata (Meyrick, 1913)
Ichneutica haedifrontella Hoare, 2019
Ichneutica hartii (Howes, 1914)
Ichneutica infensa (Walker, 1857)
Ichneutica inscripta Hoare, 2019
Ichneutica insignis (Walker, 1865)
Ichneutica lignana (Walker, 1857)
Ichneutica lindsayorum (Dugdale, 1988)
Ichneutica lissoxyla (Meyrick, 1911)
Ichneutica lithias (Meyrick, 1887)
Ichneutica lyfordi Hoare, 2019
Ichneutica marmorata (Hudson, 1924)
Ichneutica maya (Hudson, 1898)
Ichneutica micrastra (Meyrick, 1897)
Ichneutica moderata (Walker, 1865)
Ichneutica mollis (Howes, 1908)
Ichneutica morosa (Butler, 1880)
Ichneutica mustulenta Hoare, 2019
Ichneutica mutans (grey-brown cutworm) (Walker, 1857)
Ichneutica naufraga Hoare, 2019
Ichneutica nobilia (Howes, 1946)
Ichneutica notata Salmon, 1946
Ichneutica nullifera (Walker, 1857)
Ichneutica olivea (Watt,1916)
Ichneutica oliveri (Hampson, 1911)
Ichneutica omicron (Hudson, 1898)
Icheutica omoplaca (Meyrick, 1887)
Ichneutica pagaia (Hudson, 1909)
Ichneutica pelanodes (Meyrick, 1931)
Ichneutica peridotea Hoare, 2019
Ichneutica panda (Philpott, 1920)
Ichneutica paracausta (Meyrick, 1887)
Ichneutica paraxysta (Meyrick, 1929)
Ichneutica petrograpta (Meyrick, 1929)
Ichneutica phaula (Meyrick, 1887)
Ichneutica plena (Walker, 1865)
Ichneutica prismatica Hoare, 2019
Ichneutica propria (Walker, 1856)
Ichneutica purdii (Fereday, 1883) 
Ichneutica rubescens Butler, 1879 
Ichneutica rufistriga Hoare, 2019
Ichneutica sapiens (Meyrick, 1929)
Ichneutica scutata (Meyrick, 1929)
Ichneutica seducta Hoare, 2019
Ichneutica semivittata (Walker, 1865)
Ichneutica sericata (Howes, 1945)
Ichneutica sistens (Guenee, 1868)
Ichneutica skelloni (Butler, 1880)
Ichneutica similis (Philpott, 1924)
Ichneutica sollennis (Meyrick, 1914)
Ichneutica steropastis (Meyrick, 1887)
Ichneutica stulta (Philpott, 1905)
Ichneutica subcyprea Hoare, 2019
Ichneutica sulcana (Fereday, 1880)
Ichneutica supersulcana Hoare, 2019
Ichneutica thalassarche Hoare, 2019
Ichneutica theobroma Hoare, 2019
Ichneutica toroneura (Meyrick, 1901)
Ichneutica unica (Walker, 1856)
Ichneutica ustistriga (Walker, 1857)
Ichneutica virescens (Butler, 1879)
Meterana alcyone (Hudson, 1898)
Meterana asterope (Hudson, 1898)
Meterana badia (Philpott, 1927)
Meterana coctilis (Meyrick, 1931)
Meterana coeleno (Hudson, 1898)
Meterana decorata (Philpott, 1905)
Meterana diatmeta (Hudson, 1898)
Meterana dotata (Walker, 1857)
Meterana exquisita (Philpott, 1903)
Meterana grandiosa (Philpott, 1903)
Meterana inchoata (Philpott, 1920)
Meterana levis (Philpott, 1905)
Meterana merope (Hudson, 1898)
Meterana meyricci (Hampson, 1911)
Meterana ochthistis (Meyrick, 1887)
Meterana octans (Hudson, 1898)
Meterana pansicolor (Howes, 1912)
Meterana pascoi (Howes, 1912)
Meterana pauca (Philpott, 1910)
Meterana pictula (White in Taylor, 1855)
Meterana praesignis (Howes, 1911)
Meterana stipata (Walker, 1865)
Meterana tartarea (Butler, 1877)
Meterana tetrachroa (Meyrick, 1931)
Meterana vitiosa (Butler, 1877)
Mocis alterna (Walker, 1858)
Mocis frugalis (sugarcane looper) (Fabricius, 1775)
Mocis trifasciata (Stephens, 1830)
Mythimna loreyimima (sugarcane armyworm) Rungs, 1953
Mythimna separata (northern armyworm; Oriental armyworm; rice ear-cutting caterpillar) (Walker, 1865)
Nivetica nervosa (Hudson, 1922)
Pantydia sparsa Guenée, 1852
Persectania aversa (Walker, 1856)
Phalaenoides glycinae Lewin, 1805
Physetica caerulea (Guenee, 1868)
Physetica cucullina (Guenee, 1868)
Physetica funerea (Philpott, 1927)
Physetica homoscia (Meyrick, 1887)
Physetica longstaffi (Howes, 1911)
Physetica phricias (Meyrick, 1887)
Physetica prionistis (Meyrick, 1887)
Physetica temperata (Walker, 1858)
Physetica sequens (Howes, 1911)
Proteuxoa comma (Walker, 1856)
Proteuxoa sanguinipuncta (Guenee, 1868)
Proteuxoa tetronycha Hoare, 2017
Rhapsa scotosialis (slender owlet moth) Walker, 1866
Schrankia costaestrigalis (pinion-streaked snout) (Stephens, 1834)
Speiredonia spectans (granny's cloak moth) (Guenee, 1852)
Spodoptera exempta (African armyworm) (Walker, 1857)
Spodoptera litura (Oriental leafworm; cluster caterpillar; cotton leafworm; tobacco cutworm; tropical armyworm) (Fabricius, 1775)
Spodoptera mauritia acronyctoides (lawn armyworm) Guenee, 1852
Tathorhynchus exsiccata fallax Swinhoe, 1902
Thysanoplusia orichalcea (slender burnished brass; soybean looper) (Fabricius, 1775)
Tiracola plagiata (cacao armyworm) (Walker, 1857)
Trigonistis anticlina (Meyrick, 1901)

Nolidae 
Celama parvitis (Howes, 1917)
Uraba lugens Walker, 1863

Oecophoridae 
Atomotricha chloronota Meyrick, 1914
Atomotricha exsomnis Meyrick, 1913
Atomotricha isogama Meyrick, 1909
Atomotricha lewisi Philpott, 1927
Atomotricha oeconoma Meyrick, 1914
Atomotricha ommatias Meyrick, 1883
Atomotricha prospiciens Meyrick, 1924
Atomotricha sordida (Butler, 1877)
Atomotricha versuta Meyrick, 1914
Barea codrella (Felder & Rogenhofer, 1875)
Barea confusella (Walker, 1864)
Barea consignatella Walker, 1864
Barea exarcha (Meyrick, 1883)
Calicotis crucifera Meyrick, 1889
Chersadaula ochrogastra Meyrick, 1923
Coridomorpha stella Meyrick, 1914
Corocosma memorabilis Meyrick, 1927
Endrosis sarcitrella (white-shouldered house moth) (Linnaeus, 1758)
Euchersadaula lathriopa (Meyrick, 1905)
Euchersadaula tristis Philpott, 1926
Eulechria zophoessa Meyrick, 1883
Euthictis chloratma (Meyrick, 1916)
Gymnobathra ambigua (Philpott, 1926)
Gymnobathra bryaula Meyrick, 1905
Gymnobathra caliginosa Philpott, 1927
Gymnobathra calliploca Meyrick, 1883
Gymnobathra callixyla (Meyrick, 1888)
Gymnobathra cenchrias (Meyrick, 1909)
Gymnobathra dinocosma (Meyrick, 1883)
Gymnobathra flavidella (Walker, 1864)
Gymnobathra hamatella (Walker, 1864)
Gymnobathra hyetodes Meyrick, 1883
Gymnobathra inaequata Philpott, 1928
Gymnobathra jubata (Philpott, 1918)
Gymnobathra levigata Philpott, 1928
Gymnobathra omphalota Meyrick, 1888
Gymnobathra origenes Meyrick, 1936
Gymnobathra parca (Butler, 1877)
Gymnobathra philadelpha Meyrick, 1883
Gymnobathra primaria Philpott, 1928
Gymnobathra rufopunctella Hudson, 1950
Gymnobathra sarcoxantha Meyrick, 1883
Gymnobathra tholodella Meyrick, 1883
Hierodoris atychioides (Butler, 1877)
Hierodoris bilineata  (Salmon, 1948)
Hierodoris callispora (Meyrick, 1912)
Hierodoris electrica (Meyrick, 1889)
Hierodoris eremita Philpott, 1930
Hierodoris frigida Philpott, 1923
Hierodoris gerontion Hoare, 2005
Hierodoris huia Hoare, 2005
Hierodoris illita (Felder & Rogenhofer, 1875)
Hierodoris insignis Philpott, 1926
Hierodoris iophanes Meyrick, 1912
Hierodoris pachystegiae Hoare, 2005
Hierodoris polita Hoare, 2005
Hierodoris sesioides Hoare, 2005
Hierodoris s-fractum Hoare, 2005
Hierodoris squamea (Philpott, 1915)
Hierodoris stella (Meyrick, 1914)
Hierodoris torrida Hoare, 2005
Hierodoris tygris Hoare, 2005
Hofmannophila pseudospretella (brown house moth) (Stainton, 1849)
Izatha acmonias Philpott, 1921
Izatha apodoxa (Meyrick, 1888)
Izatha attactella Walker, 1864
Izatha austera (Meyrick, 1883)
Izatha balanophora (Meyrick, 1897)
Izatha blepharidota Hoare, 2010
Izatha caustopa (Meyrick, 1892)
Izatha churtoni Dugdale, 1988
Izatha convulsella (Walker, 1864)
Izatha copiosella (Walker, 1864)
Izatha dasydisca Hoare, 2010
Izatha dulcior Hoare, 2010
Izatha epiphanes (Meyrick, 1883)
Izatha florida Philpott, 1927
Izatha gekkonella Hoare, 2010
Izatha gibbsi Hoare, 2010
Izatha haumu Hoare, 2010
Izatha heroica Philpott, 1926
Izatha hudsoni Dugdale, 1988
Izatha huttonii (Butler, 1879)
Izatha katadiktya Hoare, 2010
Izatha lignyarcha Hoare, 2010 
Izatha manubriata Meyrick, 1923
Izatha mesoschista Meyrick, 1931 
Izatha metadelta Meyrick, 1905
Izatha minimira Hoare, 2010
Izatha mira Philpott, 1913
Izatha notodoxa Hoare, 2010
Izatha oleariae Dugdale, 1971
Izatha peroneanella (Walker, 1864)
Izatha phaeoptila (Meyrick, 1905)
Izatha picarella (Walker, 1864)
Izatha prasophyta (Meyrick, 1883)
Izatha psychra (Meyrick, 1883)
Izatha quinquejacula Hoare, 2010
Izatha rigescens Meyrick, 1929
Izatha spheniscella Hoare, 2010
Izatha taingo Hoare, 2010  
Izatha voluptuosa Hoare, 2010
Izatha walkerae Hoare, 2010
Lathicrossa leucocentra Meyrick, 1883
Lathicrossa prophetica Meyrick, 1927
Leptocroca amenena (Meyrick, 1888)
Leptocroca aquilonaris Philpott, 1931
Leptocroca asphaltis (Meyrick, 1911)
Leptocroca lenita Philpott, 1931
Leptocroca lindsayi Philpott, 1930
Leptocroca porophora (Meyrick, 1929)
Leptocroca sanguinolenta Meyrick, 1886
Leptocroca scholaea (Meyrick, 1883)
Leptocroca variabilis Philpott, 1926
Leptocroca vinaria (Meyrick, 1914)
Leptocroca xyrias Meyrick, 1931
Locheutis fusca Philpott, 1930
Locheutis pulla Philpott, 1928
Locheutis vagata Meyrick, 1916
Macronemata elaphia Meyrick, 1883
Mermeristis ocneropis (Meyrick, 1936)
Mermeristis spodiaea Meyrick, 1915
Opsitycha squalidella (Meyrick, 1884)
Prepalla austrina (Meyrick, 1914)
Pachyrhabda antinoma Meyrick, 1910
Phaeosaces apocrypta Meyrick, 1885
Phaeosaces coarctatella (Walker, 1864)
Phaeosaces compsotypa Meyrick, 1885
Phaeosaces lindsayae (Philpott, 1928)
Philobota chionoptera Meyrick, 1884
Schiffermuelleria orthophanes (Meyrick, 1905)
Scieropepla typhicola Meyrick, 1885
Sphyrelata amotella (Walker, 1864)
Stathmopoda albimaculata Philpott, 1931
Stathmopoda aposema Meyrick, 1901
Stathmopoda aristodoxa Meyrick, 1926
Stathmopoda caminora Meyrick, 1890
Stathmopoda campylocha Meyrick, 1889
Stathmopoda cephalaea  Meyrick, 1897
Stathmopoda coracodes Meyrick, 1923
Stathmopoda distincta Philpott, 1923
Stathmopoda endotherma Meyrick, 1931
Stathmopoda holochra Meyrick, 1889
Stathmopoda horticola Dugdale, 1988
Stathmopoda melanochra Meyrick, 1897
Stathmopoda mysteriastis Meyrick, 1901
Stathmopoda plumbiflua Meyrick, 1911
Stathmopoda skelloni Butler, 1880
Stathmopoda trimolybdias Meyrick, 1926
Tachystola acroxantha (Meyrick, 1885)
Tachystola hemisema  (Meyrick, 1885)
Thamnosara sublitella (Walker, 1864)
Thylacosceles acridomima Meyrick, 1889
Thylacosceles radians Philpott, 1918
Tinearupa sorenseni Salmon & Bradley, 1956
Tingena actinias (Meyrick, 1901)
Tingena affinis (Philpott, 1926)
Tingena afflicta (Philpott, 1926)
Tingena aletis (Meyrick, 1905)
Tingena amiculata (Philpott, 1926)
Tingena anaema (Meyrick, 1883)
Tingena ancogramma (Meyrick, 1919)
Tingena apanthes (Meyrick, 1883)
Tingena apertella (Walker, 1864)
Tingena aphrontis (Meyrick, 1883)
Tingena armigerella (Walker, 1864)
Tingena aurata (Philpott, 1931)
Tingena basella (Walker, 1863)
Tingena berenice (Meyrick, 1929)
Tingena brachyacma (Meyrick, 1909)
Tingena chloradelpha (Meyrick, 1905)
Tingena chloritis (Meyrick, 1883)
Tingena chrysogramma (Meyrick, 1883)
Tingena clarkei (Philpott, 1928)
Tingena collitella (Walker, 1864)
Tingena compsogramma (Meyrick, 1920)
Tingena contextella (Walker, 1864)
Tingena crotala (Meyrick, 1915)
Tingena decora (Philpott, 1928)
Tingena enodis (Philpott, 1927)
Tingena epichalca (Meyrick, 1886)
Tingena epimylia (Meyrick, 1883)
Tingena eriphaea (Meyrick, 1914)
Tingena eumenopa (Meyrick, 1926)
Tingena falsiloqua (Meyrick, 1932)
Tingena fenestrata (Philpott, 1926)
Tingena grata (Philpott, 1927)
Tingena griseata (Butler, 1877)
Tingena hastata (Philpott, 1916)
Tingena hemimochla (Meyrick, 1883)
Tingena homodoxa (Meyrick, 1883)
Tingena honesta (Philpott, 1929)
Tingena honorata (Philpott, 1918)
Tingena hoplodesma (Meyrick, 1883)
Tingena horaea (Meyrick, 1883)
Tingena idiogama (Meyrick, 1924)
Tingena innotella (Walker, 1864)
Tingena lassa (Philpott, 1930)
Tingena laudata (Philpott, 1930)
Tingena letharga (Meyrick, 1883)
Tingena levicula (Philpott, 1930)
Tingena loxotis (Meyrick, 1905)
Tingena macarella (Meyrick, 1883)
Tingena maranta (Meyrick, 1886)
Tingena marcida (Philpott, 1927)
Tingena melanamma (Meyrick, 1905)
Tingena melinella (Felder & Rogenhofer, 1875)
Tingena monodonta (Meyrick, 1911)
Tingena morosa (Philpott, 1926)
Tingena nycteris (Meyrick, 1890)
Tingena ombrodella (Hudson, 1950)
Tingena opaca (Philpott, 1926)
Tingena ophiodryas (Meyrick, 1936)
Tingena oporaea (Meyrick, 1883)
Tingena oxyina (Meyrick, 1883)
Tingena pallidula (Philpott, 1924)
Tingena paratrimma (Meyrick, 1910)
Tingena paula (Philpott, 1927)
Tingena penthalea (Meyrick, 1905)
Tingena perichlora (Meyrick, 1907)
Tingena pharmactis (Meyrick, 1905)
Tingena phegophylla (Meyrick, 1883)
Tingena plagiatella (Walker, 1863)
Tingena pronephela (Meyrick, 1907)
Tingena robiginosa (Philpott, 1915)
Tingena seclusa (Philpott, 1921)
Tingena serena (Philpott, 1926)
Tingena siderodeta (Meyrick, 1883)
Tingena siderota (Meyrick, 1888)
Tingena sinuosa (Philpott, 1928)
Tingena tephrophanes (Meyrick, 1929)
Tingena terrena (Philpott, 1926)
Tingena thalerodes (Meyrick, 1916)
Tingena vestita (Philpott, 1926)
Tingena xanthodesma (Philpott, 1923)
Tingena xanthomicta (Meyrick, 1916)
Trachypepla amphileuca Meyrick, 1914
Trachypepla anastrella Meyrick, 1883
Trachypepla angularis (Philpott, 1929)
Trachypepla aspidephora Meyrick, 1883
Trachypepla conspicuella (Walker, 1864)
Trachypepla contritella (Walker, 1864)
Trachypepla cyphonias Meyrick, 1927
Trachypepla euryleucota Meyrick, 1883
Trachypepla festiva Philpott, 1930
Trachypepla galaxias Meyrick, 1883
Trachypepla hieropis Meyrick, 1892
Trachypepla importuna Meyrick, 1914
Trachypepla indolescens Meyrick, 1927
Trachypepla ingenua Meyrick, 1911
Trachypepla leucoplanetis Meyrick, 1883
Trachypepla lichenodes Meyrick, 1883
Trachypepla minuta Philpott, 1931
Trachypepla nimbosa Philpott, 1930
Trachypepla photinella (Meyrick, 1883)
Trachypepla protochlora Meyrick, 1883
Trachypepla roseata Philpott, 1923
Trachypepla semilauta Philpott, 1918
Trachypepla spartodeta Meyrick, 1883

Plutellidae 
Charixena iridoxa (Meyrick, 1916)
Chrysorthenches argentea Dugdale, 1996
Chrysorthenches drosochalca (Meyrick, 1905)
Chrysorthenches glypharcha (Meyrick, 1919)
Chrysorthenches halocarpi Dugdale, 1996
Chrysorthenches phyllocladi Dugdale, 1996
Chrysorthenches polita (Philpott, 1918)
Chrysorthenches porphyritis (Meyrick, 1885)
Chrysorthenches virgata (Philpott, 1920)
Doxophyrtis hydrocosma Meyrick, 1914
Hierodoris stellata Philpott, 1918
Leuroperna sera (Meyrick, 1885)
Orthenches chartularia Meyrick, 1924
Orthenches chlorocoma Meyrick, 1885
Orthenches dictyarcha Meyrick, 1927
Orthenches disparilis Philpott, 1931
Orthenches homerica (Salmon, 1956)
Orthenches prasinodes Meyrick, 1885
Orthenches saleuta Meyrick, 1913
Orthenches semifasciata Philpott, 1915
Orthenches septentrionalis Philpott, 1930
Orthenches similis Philpott, 1924
Orthenches vinitincta Philpott, 1917
Phylacodes cauta Meyrick, 1905
Plutella antiphona Meyrick, 1901
Plutella psammochroa Meyrick, 1886
Plutella xylostella (diamondback moth) (Linnaeus, 1758)
Proditrix chionochloae Dugdale, 1987
Proditrix gahniae Dugdale, 1987
Proditrix megalynta Meyrick, 1915
Proditrix tetragona (Hudson, 1918)
Protosynaema eratopis Meyrick, 1885
Protosynaema hymenopis Meyrick, 1935
Protosynaema matutina Philpott, 1928
Protosynaema quaestuosa Meyrick, 1924
Protosynaema steropucha Meyrick, 1885

Psychidae 
Cebysa leucotelus (Australian bagmoth) Walker, 1854
Grypotheca horningae Dugdale, 1987
Grypotheca pertinax Dugdale, 1987
Grypotheca triangularis (Philpott, 1930)
Lepidoscia heliochares (Meyrick, 1893)
Lepidoscia  protorna (Meyrick, 1893) 
Liothula omnivora Fereday, 1878
Mallobathra abyssina (Clarke, 1934)
Mallobathra angusta Philpott, 1928
Mallobathra aphrosticha Meyrick, 1912
Mallobathra campbellica Dugdale, 1971
Mallobathra cana Philpott, 1927
Mallobathra cataclysma Clarke, 1934
Mallobathra crataea Meyrick, 1888
Mallobathra fenwicki Philpott, 1924
Mallobathra homalopa Meyrick, 1891
Mallobathra lapidosa Meyrick, 1914
Mallobathra memotuina Clarke, 1934
Mallobathra metrosema Meyrick, 1888
Mallobathra obscura Philpott, 1928
Mallobathra perisseuta Meyrick, 1920
Mallobathra petrodoxa (Meyrick, 1923)
Mallobathra scoriota Meyrick, 1909
Mallobathra strigulata Philpott, 1924
Mallobathra subalpina Philpott, 1930
Mallobathra tonnoiri Philpott, 1927
Orophora unicolor (Butler, 1877)
Reductoderces araneosa (Meyrick, 1914).
Reductoderces aucklandica Dugdale, 1971
Reductoderces cawthronella (Philpott, 1921)
Reductoderces fuscoflava Salmon & Bradley, 1956
Reductoderces illustris (Philpott, 1917)
Reductoderces microphanes (Meyrick, 1888)
Rhathamictis nocturna (Clarke, 1926)
Rhathamictis perspersa Meyrick, 1924
Scoriodyta conisalia Meyrick, 1888
Scoriodyta dugdalei Haettenschwiler, 1989
Scoriodyta patricki Haettenschwiler, 1989
Scoriodyta rakautarensis Haettenschwiler, 1989
Scoriodyta sereinae Haettenschwiler, 1989
Scoriodyta suttonensis Haettenschwiler, 1989
Scoriodyta virginella Haettenschwiler, 1989

Pterophoridae 
Amblyptilia aeolodes (Meyrick, 1902)
Amblyptilia deprivatalis(Walker, 1864)
Amblyptilia epotis (Meyrick, 1905)
Amblyptilia falcatalis (brown plume moth) (Walker, 1864)
Amblyptilia heliastis(Meyrick, 1885)
Amblyptilia lithoxesta (Meyrick, 1885)
Amblyptilia repletalis (Walker, 1864)
Lantanophaga pusillidactyla (lantana plume moth) (Walker, 1864)
Oxyptilus pilosellae (Zeller, 1852)
Platyptilia campsiptera Meyrick, 1907
Platyptilia celidotus (Meyrick, 1885)
Platyptilia charadrias (Meyrick, 1885)
Platyptilia carduidactyla (artichoke plume moth) (Riley, 1869)
Platyptilia hokowhitalis Hudson, 1939
Platyptilia isodactylus (Zeller, 1852)
Platyptilia isoterma Meyrick, 1909
Platyptilia pulverulenta Philpott, 1923
Pterophorus furcatalis (Walker, 1864)
Pterophorus innotatalis Walker, 1864
Pterophorus monospilalis (Walker, 1864)
Sphenarches caffer (bottle gourd plume moth) (Zeller, 1852)
Sphenarches anisodactylus (Walker, 1864)
Stenoptilia orites (Meyrick, 1885)
Stenoptilia zophodactyla (Duponchel, 1838)

Pyralidae 
Aglossa caprealis (Hübner, [1800-1809])
Aglossa pinguinalis (Linnaeus, 1758)
Balanomis encyclia Meyrick, 1887
Diasemia grammalis Doubleday in White & Doubleday, 1843
Diasemiopsis ramburialis (Duponchel, 1834)
Diplopseustis perieresalis (Walker, 1859)
Dracaenura aegialitis Meyrick, 1910
Endotricha mesenterialis (Walker, 1859)
Endotricha pyrosalis Guenee, 1854
Ephestiopsis oenobarella (Meyrick, 1879)
Eranistis pandora Meyrick, 1910
Herpetogramma licarsisalis (grass webworm; tropical grass webworm) (Walker, 1859)
Hymenia recurvalis (Fabricius, 1775)
Pyralis farinalis (meal moth) (Linnaeus, 1758)
Scoparia acharis Meyrick, 1884
Scoparia albafascicula Salmon in Salmon & Bradley, 1956
Scoparia animosa Meyrick, 1914
Scoparia apheles (Meyrick, 1884)
Scoparia asaleuta Meyrick, 1907
Scoparia astragalota Meyrick, 1885
Scoparia augastis Meyrick, 1907
Scoparia autochroa Meyrick, 1907
Scoparia autumna Philpott, 1927
Scoparia caesia Philpott, 1926
Scoparia caliginosa Philpott, 1918
Scoparia chalicodes Meyrick, 1884
Scoparia cinefacta Philpott, 1926
Scoparia claranota Howes, 1946
Scoparia clavata Philpott, 1912
Scoparia contexta Philpott, 1931
Scoparia crepuscula Salmon, 1946
Scoparia cyameuta (Meyrick, 1884)
Scoparia declivis Philpott, 1918
Scoparia diphtheralis Walker, 1866
Scoparia dryphactis Meyrick, 1911
Scoparia ejuncida Knaggs, 1867
Scoparia encapna Meyrick, 1888
Scoparia ergatis Meyrick, 1885
Scoparia exilis Knaggs, 1867
Scoparia falsa Philpott, 1924
Scoparia famularis Philpott, 1930
Scoparia fimbriata Philpott, 1917
Scoparia fragosa Meyrick, 1910
Scoparia fumata Philpott, 1915
Scoparia gracilis Philpott, 1924
Scoparia halopis Meyrick, 1909
Scoparia harpalaea Meyrick, 1885
Scoparia humilialis Hudson, 1950
Scoparia illota Philpott, 1919
Scoparia indistinctalis Walker, 1863
Scoparia limatula Philpott, 1930
Scoparia lychnophanes Meyrick, 1927
Scoparia minusculalis Walker, 1866
Scoparia molifera Meyrick, 1926
Scoparia monochroma Salmon, 1946
Scoparia niphospora (Meyrick, 1884)
Scoparia nomeutis Meyrick, 1885
Scoparia pallidula Philpott, 1928
Scoparia panopla Meyrick, 1884
Scoparia parachalca Meyrick, 1901
Scoparia parca Philpott, 1928
Scoparia parmifera Meyrick, 1909
Scoparia pascoella Philpott, 1920
Scoparia petrina Meyrick, 1885
Scoparia phalerias Meyrick, 1905
Scoparia pura Philpott, 1924
Scoparia rotuella C. Felder, R. Felder & Rogenhofer, 1875
Scoparia scripta Philpott, 1918
Scoparia sideraspis Meyrick, 1905
Scoparia sinuata Philpott, 1930
Scoparia subita Philpott, 1912
Scoparia sylvestris Clarke, 1926
Scoparia tetracycla Meyrick, 1885
Scoparia trapezophora Meyrick, 1885
Scoparia triscelis Meyrick, 1909
Scoparia tuicana Clarke, 1926
Scoparia turneri Philpott, 1928
Scoparia ustimacula C. Felder, R. Felder & Rogenhofer, 1875
Scoparia valenternota Howes, 1946
Scoparia vulpecula Meyrick, 1927
Stericta carbonalis (Guenée, 1854)

Phycitinae 
Achroia grisella (lesser wax moth) (Fabricius, 1794)
Arcola malloi (Linnaeus, 1758)
Cadra cautella (almond moth; tropical warehouse moth) (Walker, 1863)
Crocydopora cinigerella (Walker, 1866)
Cryptoblabes gnidiella (honeydew moth; Christmasberry moth) (Millière, 1867)
Delogenes limodoxa Meyrick, 1918
Ephestia elutella (cacao moth; tobacco moth; warehouse moth) (Hübner, 1796)
Ephestia kuehniella (Mediterranean flour moth; Indian flour moth; mill moth) Zeller, 1879
Ephestiopsis oenobarella  (Meyrick, 1879)
Etiella behrii (Zeller, 1848)
Galleria mellonella (greater wax moth; honeycomb moth) (Linnaeus, 1758)
Gauna aegusalis (Walker, 1859)
Homoeosoma anaspila Meyrick, 1901
Homoeosoma ischnomorpha (Mediterranean flour moth; Indian flour moth; mill moth) Meyrick, 1931
Indomalayia flabellifera (Hampson, 1896)
Morosaphycita oculiferella (Meyrick, 1879)
Oligochroa oculiferella (Meyrick, 1879)
Patagoniodes farinaria (Turner, 1904)
Pempelia genistella (Duponchel, 1836)
Plodia interpunctella (Indian meal moth; pantry moth) (Hübner, [1810-1813])
Ptyomaxia trigonogramma (Turner, 1947)
Sporophyla oenospora (Meyrick, 1897)

Roeslerstammiidae 
Dolichernis chloroleuca Meyrick, 1891
Vanicela disjunctella Walker, 1864

Saturniidae 
Actias selene (Indian moon moth; Indian luna moth) (Hübner, 1807)
Antheraea pernyi (Chinese (oak) tussah moth; temperate tussah moth) (Guérin-Méneville, 1855)
Caligula simla (Westwood, 1847)
Hyalophora cecropia (cecropia moth) (Linnaeus, 1758)
Opodiphthera eucalypti (emperor gum moth) (Scott, 1864)
Samia cynthia (ailanthus silkmoth) (Drury, 1773)

Scythrididae 
Scythris epistrota (Meyrick, 1889)
Scythris nigra Philpott, 1931
Scythris niphozela Meyrick, 1931
Scythris triatma Meyrick, 1935

Sesiidae 
Synanthedon tipuliformis (currant clearwing) (Clerck, 1759)

Sphingidae 
Agrius convolvuli (convolvulus hawk-moth) (Linnaeus, 1758)
Cizara ardeniae (coprosma hawk-moth) (Lewin, 1805)
Daphnis placida placida (Walker, 1856)
Hippotion celerio (vine hawk-moth; silver-striped hawk-moth) (Linnaeus, 1758)

Thyatiridae 
Thyatira batis (peach blossom) (Linnaeus, 1758)

Thyrididae 
Morova subfasciata Walker, 1865

Tineidae 
Amphixystis hapsimacha Meyrick, 1901
Archyala culta Philpott, 1931
Archyala lindsayi (Philpott, 1927)
Archyala opulenta Philpott, 1926
Archyala paraglypta Meyrick, 1889
Archyala pentazyga Meyrick, 1915
Archyala terranea (Butler, 1879)
Astrogenes chrysograpta Meyrick, 1921
Astrogenes insignita Philpott, 1930
Bascantis sirenica Meyrick, 1914
Crypsitricha agriopa (Meyrick, 1888)
Crypsitricha generosa Philpott, 1926
Crypsitricha mesotypa (Meyrick, 1888)
Crypsitricha pharotoma (Meyrick, 1888)
Crypsitricha roseata Meyrick, 1913
Crypsitricha stereota (Meyrick, 1914)
Dryadaula castanea Philpott, 1915
Dryadaula myrrhina Meyrick, 1905
Dryadaula pactolia Meyrick, 1901
Dryadaula terpsichorella (dancing moth) (Busck, 1910)
Endophthora omogramma Meyrick, 1888
Endophthora pallacopis Meyrick, 1918
Endophthora rubiginella Hudson, 1939
Endophthora tylogramma Meyrick, 1924
Erechthias acrodina (Meyrick, 1912)
Erechthias capnitis (Turner, 1918)
Erechthias charadrota Meyrick, 1880
Erechthias chasmatias Meyrick, 1880
Erechthias chionodira Meyrick, 1880
Erechthias crypsimima (Meyrick, 1920)
Erechthias decoranda (Meyrick, 1925)
Erechthias exospila (Meyrick, 1901)
Erechthias externella (Walker, 1864)
Erechthias flavistriata (Walsingham, 1907)
Erechthias fulguritella (Walker, 1863)
Erechthias hemiclistra (Meyrick, 1911)
Erechthias indicans Meyrick, 1923
Erechthias lychnopa Meyrick, 1927
Erechthias macrozyga Meyrick, 1916
Erechthias stilbella (Doubleday in White & Doubleday, 1843)
Erechthias terminella (Walker, 1863)
Eschatotypa derogatella (Walker, 1863)
Eschatotypa halosparta (Meyrick, 1919)
Eschatotypa melichrysa Meyrick, 1880
Eugennaea laquearia (Meyrick, 1914)
Habrophila compseuta Meyrick, 1889
Lindera tessellatella Blanchard, 1852
Lysiphragma epixyla Meyrick, 1888
Lysiphragma howesii Quail, 1901
Lysiphragma mixochlora Meyrick, 1888
Monopis argillacea Meyrick, 1893
Monopis crocicapitella Clemens, 1859
Monopis dimorphella Dugdale, 1971
Monopis ethelella Newman, 1856
Monopis ornithias Meyrick, 1888
Monopis typhlopa Meyrick, 1925
Nemapogon granella (European grain moth) (Linnaeus, 1758)
Niditinea fuscella (brown-dotted clothes moth) (Linnaeus, 1758)
Oinophila v-flava (Haworth, 1828)
Opogona aurisquamosa Swezey, 1913
Opogona comptella Walker, 1864
Opogona omoscopa Meyrick, 1893
Parochmastis hilderi (Bradley, 1956)
Petasactis technica (Meyrick, 1888)
Proterodesma byrsopola Meyrick, 1909
Proterodesma chathamica Dugdale, 1971
Proterodesma turbotti Salmon & Bradley, 1956
Prothinodes grammocosma Meyrick, 1888
Prothinodes lutata Meyrick, 1914
Sagephora exsanguis Philpott, 1918
Sagephora felix Meyrick, 1914
Sagephora jocularis Philpott, 1926
Sagephora phortegella Meyrick, 1888
Sagephora steropastis Meyrick, 1891
Sagephora subcarinata Meyrick, 1931
Tephrosara cimmeria (Meyrick, 1914)
Thallostoma eurygrapha Meyrick, 1913
Tinea accusatrix Meyrick, 1916
Tinea aetherea Clarke, 1926
Tinea argodelta Meyrick, 1915
Tinea astraea Meyrick, 1911
Tinea atmogramma Meyrick, 1927
Tinea belonota Meyrick, 1888
Tinea conferta Meyrick, 1914
Tinea conspecta Philpott, 1931
Tinea dicharacta sensu Meyrick, 1911
Tinea dividua Philpott, 1928
Tinea dubiella Stainton, 1859
Tinea fagicola Meyrick, 1921
Tinea furcillata Philpott, 1930
Tinea margaritis Meyrick, 1914
Tinea mochlota Meyrick, 1888
Tinea munita Meyrick, 1932
Tinea pallescentella Stainton, 1851
Tinea pellionella (case-bearing clothes moth) Linnaeus, 1758
Tinea sphenocosma Meyrick, 1919
Tinea texta Meyrick, 1931
Tineola bisselliella (common clothes moth; webbing clothes moth, clothing moth) (Hummel, 1823)
Trichophaga tapetzella (tapestry moth; carpet moth) (Linnaeus, 1758)
Trithamnora certella (Walker, 1863)

Tortricidae 
Acleris comariana (strawberry tortrix) Lienig & Zeller, 1846
Acroclita discariana Philpott, 1930
Apoctena clarkei Philpott, 1930b
Apoctena conditana (Walker, 1863)
Apoctena fastigata (Philpott, 1916)
Apoctena flavescens (Butler, 1877)
Apoctena orthocopa Meyrick, 1924b
Apoctena orthropis (Meyrick, 1901)
Apoctena persecta (Meyrick, 1914)
Apoctena pictoriana (C. Felder, R. Felder & Rogenhofer, 1875)
Apoctena spatiosa (Philpott, 1923)
Apoctena syntona laqueorum Dugdale, 1971
Apoctena syntona syntona Meyrick, 1909
Apoctena taipana (C. Felder, R. Felder & Rogenhofer, 1875)
Apoctena tigris (Philpott, 1914)
Argyroploce chlorosaris Meyrick, 1914
Ascerodes prochlora Meyrick, 1905
Bactra noteraula Walsingham, 1907
Bactra optanias Meyrick, 1911
Capua intractana (Walker, 1869)
Capua semiferana (oak leafroller) (Walker, 1863)
Catamacta alopecana (Meyrick, 1885)
Catamacta gavisana (Walker, 1863)
Catamacta lotinana (Meyrick, 1882)
Catamacta rureana (C. Felder, R. Felder & Rogenhofer, 1875)
Cnephasia holorphna Meyrick, 1911
Cnephasia incessana (Walker, 1863)
Cnephasia jactatana (black-lyre leafroller) (Walker, 1863)
Cnephasia latomana (Meyrick, 1885)
Cnephasia melanophaea Meyrick, 1927
Cnephasia microbathra Meyrick, 1911
Cnephasia ochnosema Meyrick, 1936
Cnephasia paterna Philpott, 1926
Crocidosema plebejana Zeller, 1847
Cryptaspasma querula (Meyrick, 1912)
Ctenopseustis filicis Dugdale, 1990
Ctenopseustis fraterna Philpott, 1930
Ctenopseustis herana (brownheaded leafroller) (C. Felder, R. Felder & Rogenhofer, 1875)
Ctenopseustis obliquana (brownheaded leafroller) (Walker, 1863)
Ctenopseustis servana (Walker, 1863)
Cydia pomonella (codling moth) (Linnaeus, 1759)
Cydia succedana(Denis & Schiffermueller, 1776)
Dipterina imbriferana Meyrick, 1881
Ecclitica hemiclista (Meyrick, 1905)
Ecclitica philpotti Dugdale, 1978
Ecclitica torogramma Meyrick, 1897
Ecclitica triorthota Meyrick, 1927
Epalxiphora axenana Meyrick, 1881
Epichorista abdita Philpott, 1924
Epichorista allogama (Meyrick, 1914)
Epichorista aspistana (Meyrick, 1882)
Epichorista crypsidora (Meyrick, 1909)
Epichorista elephantina (Meyrick, 1885)
Epichorista emphanes Meyrick, 1901
Epichorista eribola (Meyrick, 1889)
Epichorista fraudulenta (Philpott, 1928)
Epichorista hemionana (Meyrick, 1882)
Epichorista lindsayi Philpott, 1928
Epichorista mimica Philpott, 1930
Epichorista siriana (Meyrick, 1881)
Epichorista tenebrosa Philpott, 1917
Epichorista zatrophana (Meyrick, 1882)
Epiphyas postvittana (light brown apple moth) (Walker, 1863)
Ericodesma aerodana (Meyrick, 1881)
Ericodesma argentosa (Philpott, 1924)
Ericodesma cuneata (Clarke, 1926)
Ericodesma melanosperma (Meyrick, 1916)
Ericodesma scruposa (Philpott, 1924)
Eurythecta curva Philpott, 1918
Eurythecta eremana (Meyrick, 1885)
Eurythecta leucothrinca (Meyrick, 1931)
Eurythecta loxias (Meyrick, 1888)
Eurythecta phaeoxyla Meyrick, 1938
Eurythecta robusta (Butler, 1877)
Eurythecta zelaea Meyrick, 1905
Gelophaula aenea (Butler, 1877)
Gelophaula aridella Clarke, 1934
Gelophaula lychnophanes (Meyrick, 1916)
Gelophaula palliata (Philpott, 1914)
Gelophaula praecipitalis Meyrick, 1934
Gelophaula siraea (Meyrick, 1885)
Gelophaula tributaria (Philpott, 1913)
Gelophaula trisulca (Meyrick, 1916)
Gelophaula vana Philpott, 1928
Grapholita molesta (Oriental fruit moth; peach moth) (Busck in Quaintance & Wood, 1916)
Harmologa amplexana (Zeller, 1875)
Harmologa columella Meyrick, 1927
Harmologa festiva Philpott, 1915
Harmologa oblongana (Walker, 1863)
Harmologa petrias Meyrick, 1901
Harmologa pontifica Meyrick, 1911
Harmologa reticularis Philpott, 1915
Harmologa sanguinea Philpott, 1915
Harmologa scoliastis (Meyrick, 1907)
Harmologa sisyrana Meyrick, 1882
Harmologa speciosa (Philpott, 1927)
Harmologa toroterma Hudson, 1925
Hendecasticha aethaliana Meyrick, 1881
Holocola charopa (Meyrick, 1888)
Holocola dolopaea (Meyrick, 1905)
Holocola emplasta (Meyrick, 1901)
Holocola parthenia (Meyrick, 1888)
Holocola zopherana (Meyrick, 1881)
Isotenes miserana (Walker, 1863)
Leucotenes coprosmae (Dugdale, 1990)
Lopharcha insolita (Dugdale, 1966)
Maoritenes cyclobathra (Meyrick, 1907)
Maoritenes modesta (Philpott, 1930)
Merophyas divulsana (Walker, 1863)
Merophyas leucaniana (Walker, 1863)
Merophyas paraloxa (Meyrick, 1907)
Ochetarcha miraculosa (Meyrick, 1917)
Parienia mochlophorana (Meyrick, 1883)
Philocryptica polypodii (Watt, 1921)
Planotortrix avicenniae Dugdale, 1990
Planotortrix excessana (greenheaded leafroller) (Walker, 1863)
Planotortrix flammea (Salmon, 1956)
Planotortrix notophaea (Turner, 1926)
Planotortrix octo Dugdale, 1990
Planotortrix octoides Dugdale, 1990
Planotortrix puffini Dugdale, 1990
Polychrosis meliscia Meyrick, 1910
Prothelymna antiquana (Walker, 1863)
Prothelymna niphostrota (Meyrick, 1907)
Protithona fugitivana Meyrick, 1883
Protithona potamias Meyrick, 1909
Pyrgotis arcuata (Philpott, 1915)
Pyrgotis calligypsa (Meyrick, 1926)
Pyrgotis chrysomela (Meyrick, 1914)
Pyrgotis consentiens Philpott, 1916
Pyrgotis eudorana Meyrick, 1885
Pyrgotis humilis Philpott, 1930
Pyrgotis plagiatana (Walker, 1863)
Pyrgotis plinthoglypta Meyrick, 1892
Pyrgotis pyramidias Meyrick, 1901
Pyrgotis transfixa (Meyrick, 1924)
Pyrgotis zygiana Meyrick, 1882
Sorensenata agilitata Salmon & Bradley, 1956
Strepsicrates ejectana (Walker, 1863)
Strepsicrates infensa (Meyrick, 1911)
Strepsicrates macropetana (eucalyptus leafroller) (Meyrick, 1881)
Strepsicrates melanotreta (Meyrick, 1910)
Strepsicrates sideritis (Meyrick, 1905)
Tortrix antichroa Meyrick, 1919
Tortrix demiana Meyrick, 1882
Tortrix fervida (Meyrick, 1901)
Tortrix incendiaria (Meyrick, 1923)
Tortrix molybditis Meyrick, 1907
Tortrix sphenias (Meyrick, 1909)
Tortrix zestodes Meyrick, 1924
Zomariana doxasticana (Meyrick, 1881)

Yponomeutidae 
Kessleria copidota (Meyrick, 1889)
Prays nephelomima (citrus flower moth) Meyrick, 1907
Zelleria maculata Philpott, 1930
Zelleria porphyraula Meyrick, 1927
Zelleria rorida Philpott, 1918
Zelleria sphenota (Meyrick, 1889)

Zygaenidae 
Artona martini Efetov, 1997

Unknown family 
Cadmogenes literata Meyrick, 1923
Lysiphragma argentaria Salmon, 1948
Titanomis sisyrota Meyrick, 1888

See also 
Fauna of New Zealand
Environment of New Zealand

References

Further reading

External links 

Te Ara – the Encyclopedia of New Zealand – Butterflies and moths
New Zealand Entomological Society
Monarch Butterfly NZ Trust
New Zealand Lepidoptera

 01
Lepidoptera
New Zealand
New Zealand
New Zealand
New Zealand
New Zealand
New Zealand
New Zealand
New Zealand
New Zealand